Kitt is a surname of English and German origins.  Notable people with the surname include:

Captain Kitt (active  1820), Irish Whiteboys captain
A. J. Kitt (born 1968), alpine ski racer
Camille and Kennerly Kitt, identical twin American actresses and harpists
David Kitt (born 1975), Irish musician
Eartha Kitt (1927–2008), American actress, singer, and cabaret star
Michael F. Kitt (1914–1974), Irish Fianna Fáil politician and long-serving Teachta Dála
Michael P. Kitt (born 1950), Irish Fianna Fáil party politician
Sandra Kitt, African-American author of contemporary romance novels
Theo Kitt (born 1912), German bobsledder
Tom Kitt (politician) (born 1952), Irish Fianna Fáil politician and Teachta Dála
Tom Kitt (musician) (born 1974), American composer and conductor

See also
 Kitts (surname)

English-language surnames
German-language surnames